The 1969 European Competition for Women's Football was a women's association football tournament contested by European nations. It took place in Italy from 1 to 2 November 1969, and was organised by the FICF (Federazione Italiana Calcio Femminile).

The tournament featured 4 teams, with games staged in Novara, Aosta and Turin. Considered unofficial because it was not run under the auspices of UEFA, it was a precursor to the UEFA Women's Championship. Italy won the tournament, beating Denmark 3–1 in the final.

Knockout stage

Semi-finals

Third place match

Final

Winner

Top goalscorers
4 goals

 Sue Lopez

2 goals

 Irene Christensen
 Lone Hansen
 Maurizia Ciceri

1 goals

 Sarcikova
 Tungate
 Aurora Giubertoni
 Stefania Medri

Final standings

References

UEFA Women's Championship tournaments
International association football competitions hosted by Italy
1969 in Italian women's sport
November 1969 sports events in Europe
Women's football competitions in Italy
1969–70 in Italian football
Sports competitions in Turin
1960s in Turin
Sport in Novara
Sport in Aosta Valley
1969 in women's association football